The  was held on 4 February 2007 in Kannai Hall, Yokohama, Kanagawa, Japan.

Awards
 Best Film: Yureru
 Best Actor: Teruyuki Kagawa – Yureru
 Best Actress: Yū Aoi – Hula Girls, Honey and Clover
 Best Supporting Actor: Takashi Sasano – Metro ni Notte, Nezu no Ban, Tsuribaka Nisshi 17: Ato wa Noto nare Hama to nare!, Adan
 Best Supporting Actress:
Yūko Nakamura – Strawberry Shortcakes
Kazue Fukiishi – What the Snow Brings, Tegami, Memories of Tomorrow
 Best Director: Miwa Nishikawa – Yureru
 Best New Director: Takayuki Nakamura – Yokohama Mary
 Best Screenplay: Miwa Nishikawa – Yureru
 Best Cinematography: Isao Ishii – Strawberry Shortcakes
 Best New Talent:
Kenichi Matsuyama – Death Note,  Otoko-tachi no Yamato, Oyayubi Sagashi
Yuriko Yoshitaka – Noriko's Dinner Table
 Special Jury Prize: Takayuki Nakamura – Yokohama Mary

Best 10
 Yureru
 Hula Girls
 Memories of Matsuko
 What the Snow Brings
 Kamome Shokudo
 Yokohama Mary
 Strawberry Shortcakes
 Yawarakai Seikatsu
 The Professor's Beloved Equation
 The Girl Who Leapt Through Time
runner-up. The Blossoming of Kamiya Etsuko

References

Yokohama Film Festival
Y
Y
2007 in Japanese cinema
February 2007 events in Japan